A rougine is an instrument used in Ophthalmology. It is used to operate on the conjunctival sac.

See also
Instruments used in general surgery

Surgical instruments